Joseph Caravalho Jr., M.D., (born c. 1957) is a physician and retired Major General of the Medical Corps of the United States Army. He is currently the president and CEO of the Henry M. Jackson Foundation for the Advancement of Military Medicine. He has held specialized staff medical positions, served in operations at hospitals, and commanded major medical installations across the United States as well as operations in actions overseas. In December 2015, he was appointed as the Joint Staff surgeon, the chief medical advisor to the Chairman of the Joint Chiefs of Staff.

Early life and education
Joseph Caravalho Jr. was born in 1957 in Hawaii to Agnes and Joseph Caravalho, Sr. and grew up in Kaneohe, Oahu. His family is of Puerto Rican and Chinese descent. He attended St. Louis High School in Honolulu. He graduated from Gonzaga University in Spokane, Washington with a BS in Mathematics in 1979 and was commissioned a second lieutenant through the Army ROTC Program. He then completed his medical degree at the Uniformed Services University of the Health Sciences School of Medicine, and was commissioned a captain in the United States Army Medical Corps. He is also a graduate of the Army War College, where he earned a master's degree in strategic studies.

Career
Caravalho has held positions as a staff internist, nuclear medicine physician, and cardiologist. He served as Chief of Cardiology at Tripler Army Medical Center, Honolulu, Hawaii, and as Deputy Commander for Clinical Services at Womack Army Medical Center in Fort Bragg, North Carolina.

His operational medical experience includes assignments as Surgeon, 1st Battalion, 1st Special Forces Group (Airborne), Okinawa, Japan; Physician Augmentee, Joint Special Operations Command, Fort Bragg; Surgeon, 75th Ranger Regiment, Fort Benning, GA; Deputy Chief of Staff, Surgeon, U.S. Army Special Operations Command; Assistant Chief of Staff, Health Affairs, XVIII Airborne Corps, Fort Bragg. He also commanded the 28th Combat Support Hospital and the 44th Medical Command (Rear) (Provisional), both at Fort Bragg.

He has had two deployments in support of Operation Iraqi Freedom, most recently serving as the Surgeon for both Multi-National Force-Iraq and Multi-National Corps-Iraq. After his last deployment, he served as the Commanding General for Great Plains Regional Medical Command (RMC). Following USAMEDCOM reorganization, he commanded both Southern RMC and Brooke AMC, at Fort Sam Houston, Texas. Caravalho served as Commanding General, Northern RMC, Fort Belvoir, Virginia. He next served as Commanding General, U.S. Army Medical Research and Materiel Command, and Fort Detrick, at Fort Detrick, Maryland. In 2015 he was selected as Deputy Surgeon General and Deputy Commanding General (Support), United States Army Medical Command. In December 2015, it was announced that Caravalho was assigned to the Joint Staff as chief medical advisor ("Joint Staff Surgeon").<ref name="HSCaravalho joined The Henry M. Jackson Foundation for the Advancement of Military Medicine The Henry M. Jackson Foundation for the Advancement of Military Medicine welcomed Caravalho as their President and CEO on September 1st, 2017 where he currently serves as leadership for 2800 medical and research professionals.

Awards and recognitions

References

External links

 Profile: Maj. Gen. (Dr.) Joseph Caravalho, Jr. – Joint Chiefs of Staff
 "Fluent in the 'international language' of health:; Q&A with top doc in Iraq", Gonzaga Quarterly, Summer 2009
 Highlights from Joseph Caravalho's Speech, Asian Pacific American Medical Students Association (APAMSA) National Conference 2009

Living people
Gonzaga University alumni
People from Oahu
Recipients of the Distinguished Service Medal (US Army)
Recipients of the Legion of Merit
Uniformed Services University of the Health Sciences alumni
United States Army generals
1957 births